Pseudogaltara is a monotypic tiger moth genus in the family Erebidae. Its only species, Pseudogaltara inexpectata, can be found in Rwanda. Both the genus and species were first described by Hervé de Toulgoët in 1978.

References

Nyctemerina
Erebid moths of Africa
Monotypic moth genera
Moths described in 1978